Eustache le Peintre de Reims or Eustache de Rains (fl. 1225–40) was a trouvère from Reims, possibly a painter, but that may just be a family name. Seven poems of his are preserved in surviving chansonniers.

Eustache addressed one of his songs, "", to Guigues IV, Count of Forez and Nevers. Guigues participated in the Barons' Crusade of Theobald I of Navarre in 1239 and died in 1241; Eustache's poem was probably written during this time.

All of Eustache's poems are in isometric decasyllables; stanzas are usually eight lines in length with two rhymes. His melodies are simple, and recorded in bar form.

Works
""
""
""
""
""
""
""

References
Karp, Theodore. "Eustache Le Peintre de Reims." Grove Music Online. Oxford Music Online. Accessed 20 September 2008.

Trouvères
13th-century French people
Male classical composers